The Women's 800 metres at the 1988 Summer Olympics in Seoul, South Korea had an entry list of 29 competitors, with four qualifying heats (29) and two semi-finals (16), before the final (8) took off on Monday September 26, 1988.

Medalists

Records
These were the standing world and Olympic records (in minutes) prior to the 1988 Summer Olympics.

Final

Semi finals

Qualifying heats

See also
 1987 Women's World Championships 800 metres (Rome)
 1990 Women's European Championships 800 metres (Split)
 1991 Women's World Championships 800 metres (Tokyo)
 1992 Women's Olympic 800 metres (Barcelona)

References

External links
  Official Report

8
800 metres at the Olympics
1988 in women's athletics
Women's events at the 1988 Summer Olympics